The minivets are passerine birds belonging to the genus Pericrocotus in the cuckooshrike family Campephagidae. There are about 15 species, occurring mainly in forests in southern and eastern Asia. They are fairly small, slender birds with long tails and an erect posture. Many species have bright red or yellow markings. They feed mainly on insects, foraging in groups in the tree canopy.

Species list
The genus contains 15 species:
 Rosy minivet, Pericrocotus roseus
 Swinhoe's minivet or brown-rumped minivet, Pericrocotus cantonensis
 Ashy minivet, Pericrocotus divaricatus
 Ryukyu minivet, Pericrocotus tegimae
 Small minivet, Pericrocotus cinnamomeus
 Fiery minivet, Pericrocotus igneus
 Little minivet, Pericrocotus lansbergei
 White-bellied minivet, Pericrocotus erythropygius
 Jerdon's minivet, Pericrocotus albifrons
 Grey-chinned minivet, Pericrocotus solaris
 Long-tailed minivet, Pericrocotus ethologus
 Short-billed minivet, Pericrocotus brevirostris
 Sunda minivet, Pericrocotus miniatus
 Scarlet minivet, Pericrocotus speciosus
 Orange minivet, Pericrocotus flammeus

References

Perrins, Christopher, ed. (2004) The New Encyclopedia of Birds, Oxford University Press, Oxford.

Bird genera